The Podriga is a left tributary of the river Bașeu in Romania. It discharges into the Bașeu in Săveni.

References

Rivers of Romania
Rivers of Botoșani County